Michael Frederick Laughton (born February 21, 1944) is a Canadian former professional ice hockey player who played 189 games in the National Hockey League (NHL) and 203 games in the World Hockey Association (WHA).  He played for the NHL Oakland Seals and California Golden Seals, as well as the WHA New York Raiders, New York Golden Blades, Jersey Knights, and San Diego Mariners.

Between his time in the NHL and the WHA, Laughton was sold to the Montreal Canadiens before the start of the 1971-72 season by the California Golden Seals.  Not being able to make the team with an already stacked lineup, Laughton was sent down to the Nova Scotia Voyageurs of the American Hockey League and made team captain by head coach Al MacNeil.  He led the team that included Larry Robinson and Yvon Lambert, future stars on the Canadiens, to the 1972 Calder Cup championship. He then signed in the WHA.

After being chosen in the 1975 intra-league draft by the WHA Calgary Cowboys and failing to come to terms on a contract, he returned to his hometown of Nelson to become player-coach of the Nelson Maple Leafs of the Western International Hockey
League.

Career statistics

Regular season and playoffs

References

External links 
 

1944 births
Living people
California Golden Seals players
Canadian ice hockey centres
Cleveland Barons (1937–1973) players
Ice hockey people from British Columbia
Jersey Knights players
New York Golden Blades players
New York Raiders players
Nova Scotia Voyageurs players
Oakland Seals players
People from Nelson, British Columbia
San Diego Mariners players
Syracuse Blazers players
Vancouver Canucks (WHL) players
Victoria Maple Leafs players
Western International Hockey League players